The Creepy Line is a 2018 American documentary exploring the influence Google and Facebook have on public opinion, and the power the companies have that is not regulated or controlled by national government legislation.

The title is taken from a quote by Eric Schmidt, who when describing Google's use of personal information stated that the company did not cross the line that an ordinary user would find unacceptable. It was released in October 2018.

Synopsis 
The film contrasts the notion of fake news which is visible, with the invisible ranking or masking of information by Google and Facebook, and features headshot interviews with Robert Epstein, Jaron Lanier, Jordan Peterson and Peter Schweizer.

Reception 
The Verge reviewed The Creepy Line, writing that "Despite its dark name, The Creepy Line appeals to the comforting logic of conspiracy: when something goes wrong in life, it’s because an all-powerful entity thinks you’re important enough to attack."

References

External links

 
 

American documentary films
Films about social media
Criticisms of software and websites
Documentary films about Google
2010s English-language films
2010s American films